Jean-Luc Godard (3 December 193013 September 2022) was a French-Swiss film director, screenwriter, and film critic. He rose to prominence as a pioneer of the French New Wave film movement of the 1960s, alongside such filmmakers as François Truffaut, Agnès Varda, Éric Rohmer, and Jacques Demy. He was arguably the most influential French filmmaker of the post-war era. According to AllMovie, his work "revolutionized the motion picture form" through its experimentation with narrative, continuity, sound, and camerawork. His most acclaimed films include Breathless (1960), Vivre sa vie (1962), Contempt (1963), Band of Outsiders (1964), Alphaville (1965), Pierrot le Fou (1965), Masculin Féminin (1966), Weekend (1967), and Goodbye to Language (2014).

During his early career as a film critic for the influential magazine Cahiers du Cinéma, Godard criticised mainstream French cinema's "Tradition of Quality", which de-emphasised innovation and experimentation. In response, he and like-minded critics began to make their own films, challenging the conventions of traditional Hollywood in addition to French cinema. Godard first received global acclaim for his 1960 feature Breathless, helping to establish the New Wave movement. His work makes use of frequent homages and references to film history, and often expressed his political views; he was an avid reader of existentialism and Marxist philosophy, and in 1969 formed the Dziga Vertov Group with other radical filmmakers to promote political works. After the New Wave, his politics were less radical, and his later films are about human conflict and artistic representation "from a humanist rather than Marxist perspective."

Godard was married three times, to actresses Anna Karina and Anne Wiazemsky, both of whom starred in several of his films, and later to his longtime partner Anne-Marie Miéville. His collaborations with Karina—which included such critically acclaimed films as Vivre sa vie (1962), Bande à part (1964), and Pierrot le Fou (1965)—were called "arguably the most influential body of work in the history of cinema" by Filmmaker magazine. In a 2002 Sight & Sound poll, Godard ranked third in the critics' top ten directors of all time. He is said to have "generated one of the largest bodies of critical analysis of any filmmaker since the mid-twentieth century." His work has been central to narrative theory and has "challenged both commercial narrative cinema norms and film criticism's vocabulary." In 2010, Godard was awarded an Academy Honorary Award.

Early life 
Jean-Luc Godard was born on 3 December 1930 in the 7th arrondissement of Paris, the son of Odile (née Monod) and Paul Godard, a Swiss physician. His wealthy parents came from Protestant families of Franco–Swiss descent, and his mother was the daughter of Julien Monod, a founder of the Banque Paribas. She was the great-granddaughter of theologian Adolphe Monod. Other relatives on his mother's side include composer Jacques-Louis Monod, naturalist Théodore Monod, pastor Frédéric Monod, and former Prime Minister and later President of Peru Pedro Pablo Kuczynski. Four years after Jean-Luc's birth, his father moved the family to Switzerland. At the outbreak of the Second World War, Godard was in France, and returned to Switzerland with difficulty. He spent most of the war in Switzerland, although his family made clandestine trips to his grandfather's estate on the French side of Lake Geneva. Godard attended school in Nyon, Switzerland.

Not a frequent cinema-goer, he attributed his introduction to cinema to a reading of André Malraux's essay Outline of a Psychology of Cinema, and his reading of La Revue du cinéma, which was relaunched in 1946. In 1946, he went to study at the Lycée Buffon in Paris and, through family connections, mixed with members of its cultural elite. He lodged with the writer Jean Schlumberger. Having failed his baccalauréat exam in 1948 he returned to Switzerland. He studied in Lausanne and lived with his parents, whose marriage was breaking up. He spent time in Geneva also with a group that included another film fanatic, Roland Tolmatchoff, and the extreme rightist philosopher Jean Parvulesco. His elder sister Rachel encouraged him to paint, which he did, in an abstract style. After time spent at a boarding school in Thonon to prepare for the retest, which he passed, he returned to Paris in 1949. He registered for a certificate in anthropology at the University of Paris (Sorbonne), but did not attend class.

Early career (1950–1959)

Film criticism 
In Paris, in the Latin Quarter just prior to 1950, ciné-clubs (film societies) were gaining prominence. Godard began attending these clubs—the Cinémathèque Française, Ciné-Club du Quartier Latin (CCQL), Work and Culture ciné club, and others—which became his regular haunts. The Cinémathèque was founded by Henri Langlois and Georges Franju in 1936; Work and Culture was a workers' education group for which André Bazin had organised wartime film screenings and discussions and which had become a model for the film clubs that had risen throughout France after the Liberation; CCQL, founded in about 1947 or 1948, was animated and intellectually led by Maurice Schérer. At these clubs he met fellow film enthusiasts including Jacques Rivette, Claude Chabrol, and François Truffaut. Godard was part of a generation for whom cinema took on a special importance. He said: "In the 1950s cinema was as important as bread—but it isn't the case anymore. We thought cinema would assert itself as an instrument of knowledge, a microscope... a telescope.... At the Cinémathèque I discovered a world which nobody had spoken to me about. They'd told us about Goethe, but not Dreyer. ... We watched silent films in the era of talkies. We dreamed about film. We were like Christians in the catacombs."

His foray into films began in the field of criticism. Along with Maurice Schérer (writing under the to-be-famous pseudonym Éric Rohmer) and Jacques Rivette, he founded the short-lived film journal , which saw the publication of five issues in 1950. When Bazin co-founded the influential critical magazine Cahiers du Cinéma in 1951, Godard was the first of the younger critics from the CCQL/Cinémathèque group to be published. The January 1952 issue featured his review of an American melodrama directed by Rudolph Maté, No Sad Songs for Me. His "Defence and Illustration of Classical Découpage" published in September 1952, in which he attacks an earlier article by Bazin and defends the use of the shot–reverse shot technique, is one of his earliest important contributions to cinema criticism. Praising Otto Preminger and "the greatest American artist—Howard Hawks", Godard raises their harsh melodramas above the more "formalistic and overtly artful films of Welles, De Sica, and Wyler which Bazin endorsed". At this point Godard's activities did not include making films. Rather, he watched films, and wrote about them, and helped others make films, notably Rohmer, with whom he worked on Présentation ou Charlotte et son steak.

Filmmaking 
Having left Paris in the fall of 1952, Godard returned to Switzerland and went to live with his mother in Lausanne. He became friendly with his mother's lover, Jean-Pierre Laubscher, who was a labourer on the Grande Dixence Dam. Through Laubscher he secured work himself as a construction worker at the Plaz Fleuri work site at the dam. He saw the possibility of making a documentary film about the dam; when his initial contract ended, in order to prolong his time at the dam, he moved to the post of telephone switchboard operator. Whilst on duty, in April 1954, he put through a call to Laubscher which relayed the fact that Odile Monod, Godard's mother, had died in a scooter accident. Thanks to Swiss friends who lent him a 35 mm movie camera, he was able to shoot on 35mm film. He rewrote the commentary that Laubscher had written, and gave his film a rhyming title Opération béton (Operation Concrete). The company that administered the dam bought the film and used it for publicity purposes.

As he continued to work for Cahiers, he made Une femme coquette (1955), a 10-minute short, in Geneva; and in January 1956 he returned to Paris. A plan for a feature film of Goethe's Elective Affinities proved too ambitious and came to nothing. Truffaut enlisted his help to work on an idea he had for a film based on the true-crime story of a petty criminal, Michel Portail, who had shot a motorcycle policeman and whose girlfriend had turned him in to the police, but Truffaut failed to interest any producers. Another project with Truffaut, a comedy about a country girl arriving in Paris, was also abandoned. He worked with Rohmer on a planned series of short films centering on the lives of two young women, Charlotte and Véronique; and in the autumn of 1957, Pierre Braunberger produced the first film in the series, All the Boys Are Called Patrick, directed by Godard from Rohmer's script. A Story of Water (1958) was created largely out of unused footage shot by Truffaut. In 1958, Godard, with a cast that included Jean-Paul Belmondo and Anne Colette, made his last short before gaining international prominence as a filmmaker, Charlotte et son Jules, a homage to Jean Cocteau. The film was shot in Godard's hotel room on the rue de Rennes and apparently reflected something of the 'romantic austerity' of Godard's own life at this time. His Swiss friend Roland Tolmatchoff noted: "In Paris he had a big Bogart poster on the wall and nothing else." In December 1958, Godard reported from the Festival of Short Films in Tours and praised the work of, and became friends with, Jacques Demy, Jacques Rozier, and Agnès Varda—he already knew Alain Resnais whose entry he praised—but Godard now wanted to make a feature film. He travelled to the 1959 Cannes Film Festival and asked Truffaut to let him use the story on which they had collaborated in 1956, about car thief Michel Portail. He sought money from producer Georges de Beauregard, whom he had met previously whilst working briefly in the publicity department of Twentieth Century Fox's Paris office, and who was also at the Festival. Beauregard could offer his expertise, but was in debt from two productions based on Pierre Loti stories; hence, financing came instead from a film distributor, René Pignières.

New Wave period (1960–1967) 
Godard's most celebrated period as a director spans roughly from his first feature, Breathless (1960), through to Week End (1967). His work during this period focused on relatively conventional films that often refer to different aspects of film history. Although Godard's work during this time is considered groundbreaking in its own right, the period stands in contrast to that which immediately followed it, during which Godard ideologically denounced much of cinema's history as bourgeois and therefore without merit.

Films

Breathless
Godard's Breathless (À bout de souffle, 1960), starring Jean-Paul Belmondo and Jean Seberg, distinctly expressed the French New Wave's style, and incorporated quotations from several elements of popular culture—specifically American film noir. The film employed various techniques such as the innovative use of jump cuts (which were traditionally considered amateurish), character asides, and breaking the eyeline match in continuity editing. Another unique aspect of Breathless was the spontaneous writing of the script on the day of shooting—a technique that the actors found unsettling—which contribute to the spontaneous, documentary-like ambience of the film.

From the beginning of his career, Godard included more film references in his movies than any of his New Wave colleagues. In Breathless, his citations include a movie poster showing Humphrey Bogart—from The Harder They Fall, his last film (whose expression the lead actor Jean-Paul Belmondo tries reverently to imitate)—visual quotations from films of Ingmar Bergman, Samuel Fuller, Fritz Lang, and others; and an onscreen dedication to Monogram Pictures, an American B-movie studio. Quotations from, and references to literature, include William Faulkner, Dylan Thomas, Louis Aragon, Rilke, Françoise Sagan, and Maurice Sachs. The film also contains citations in images or on the soundtrack—Mozart, Picasso, J. S. Bach, Paul Klee, and Auguste Renoir. "This first-person cinema invoked not the director's experience but his presence".

Godard wanted to hire the American actress Jean Seberg, who was living in Paris with her husband François Moreuil, a lawyer, to play the American woman. Seberg had become famous in 1956 when Otto Preminger had chosen her to play Joan of Arc in his Saint Joan, and had then cast her in his acidulous 1958 adaptation of Bonjour Tristesse. Her performance in this film had not been generally regarded as a success—The New York Timess critic called her a "misplaced amateur"—but Truffaut and Godard disagreed. In the role of Michel Poiccard, Godard cast Belmondo, an actor he had already called, writing in Arts in 1958, "the Michel Simon and the Jules Berry of tomorrow." The cameraman was Raoul Coutard, choice of the producer Beauregard. Godard wanted Breathless to be shot like a documentary, with a lightweight handheld camera and a minimum of added lighting; Coutard had experience as a documentary cameraman while working for the French army's information service in Indochina during the French-Indochina War. Tracking shots were filmed by Coutard from a wheelchair pushed by Godard. Though Godard had prepared a traditional screenplay, he dispensed with it and wrote the dialogue day by day as the production went ahead. The film's importance was recognised immediately, and in January 1960 Godard won the Jean Vigo Prize, awarded "to encourage an auteur of the future". One reviewer mentioned Alexandre Astruc's prophecy of the age of the caméra-stylo, the camera that a new generation would use with the efficacy with which a writer uses his pen—"here is in fact the first work authentically written with a caméra-stylo.

Early work with Anna Karina
In 1960 Godard shot Le petit soldat (The Little Soldier). The cast included Godard's future wife Anna Karina. At this time Karina had virtually no experience as an actress. Godard used her awkwardness as an element of her performance. Godard and Karina were a couple by the end of the shoot. She appeared again, along with Belmondo, in Godard's first color film, A Woman Is a Woman (1961), their first project to be released. The film was intended as a homage to the American musical. Adjustments that Godard made to the original version of the story gave it autobiographical resonances, "specifically in regard to his relationship with Anna Karina." The film revealed "the confinement within the four walls of domestic life" and "the emotional and artistic fault lines that threatened their relationship".

My Life to Live
Godard's next film, Vivre sa vie (My Life to Live, 1962), was one of his most popular among critics. Karina starred as Nana, an errant mother and aspiring actress whose financially strained circumstances lead her to the life of a streetwalker. It is an episodic account of her rationalisations to prove she is free, even though she is tethered at the end of her pimp's short leash. In one scene, within a café, she spreads her arms out and announces she is free to raise or lower them as she wishes.

The film was a popular success and led to Columbia Pictures giving him a deal where he would be provided with $100,000 to make a movie, with complete artistic control.

The Little Soldier and Les Carabiniers
Le petit soldat was not released until 1963, the first of three films he released that year. Le petit soldat dealt with the Algerian War of Independence. It was banned by the French government for the next two years due to its political nature. The 'little soldier' Bruno Forestier was played by Michel Subor. Forestier was a character close to Godard himself, an image-maker and intellectual, 'more or less my spokesman, but not totally' Godard told an interviewer.

The film begins on 13 May 1958, the date of the attempted putsch in Algeria, and ends later the same month. In the film, Bruno Forestier, a photojournalist who has links with a right-wing paramilitary group working for the French government, is ordered to murder a professor accused of aiding the Algerian resistance. He is in love with Veronica Dreyer, a young woman who has worked with the Algerian fighters. He is captured by Algerian militants and tortured. His organisation captures and tortures her. In making Le petit soldat, Godard took the unusual step of writing dialogue every day and calling the lines to the actors during filming – a technique made possible by filming without direct sound and dubbing dialogue in post-production.

His following film was Les Carabiniers, based on a story by Roberto Rossellini, one of Godard's influences. The film follows two peasants who join the army of a king, only to find futility in the whole thing as the king reveals the deception of war-administrating leaders.

Contempt 
His final film of 1963 and the most commercially successful film of his career was Le Mépris (Contempt), starring Michel Piccoli and one of France's biggest female stars, Brigitte Bardot. The film follows Paul (Piccoli), a screenwriter who is commissioned by Prokosch (Jack Palance), an arrogant American movie producer, to rewrite the script for an adaptation of Homer's Odyssey, which the Austrian director Fritz Lang has been filming. Lang's 'high culture' interpretation of the story is lost on Prokosch, whose character is a firm indictment of the commercial motion picture hierarchy.

Anouchka Films
In 1964, Godard and Karina formed a production company, Anouchka Films. He directed Bande à part (Band of Outsiders), another collaboration between the two and described by him as "Alice in Wonderland meets Franz Kafka." It follows two young men, looking to score on a heist, who both fall in love with Karina, and quotes from several gangster film conventions. While promoting the film, Godard wrote that according to D. W. Griffith, all one needs to make a film is "a girl and a gun."

Une femme mariée (A Married Woman, 1964) followed Band of Outsiders. It was a slow, deliberate, toned-down black-and-white picture without a real story. The film was shot in four weeks and was "an explicitly and stringently modernist film". It showed Godard's "engagement with the most advanced thinking of the day, as expressed in the work of Claude Lévi-Strauss and Roland Barthes" and its fragmentation and abstraction reflected also "his loss of faith in the familiar Hollywood styles." Godard made the film during the planning phase for Pierrot le Fou (1965).

In 1965, Godard directed Alphaville, a futuristic blend of science fiction, film noir, and satire. Eddie Constantine starred as Lemmy Caution, a detective who is sent into a city controlled by a giant computer named Alpha 60. His mission is to make contact with Professor von Braun (Howard Vernon), a famous scientist who has fallen mysteriously silent, and is believed to be suppressed by the computer. His next film was Pierrot le Fou (1965). Gilles Jacob, an author, critic, and president of the Cannes Film Festival, called it both a "retrospective" and recapitulation. He solicited the participation of Jean-Paul Belmondo, by then a famous actor, in order to guarantee the necessary amount of funding for the expensive film. Godard said the film was "connected with the violence and loneliness that lie so close to happiness today. It's very much a film about France."

Masculin Féminin (1966), based on two Guy de Maupassant stories, La Femme de Paul and Le Signe, was a study of contemporary French youth and their involvement with cultural politics. An intertitle refers to the characters as "The children of Marx and Coca-Cola." Although Godard's cinema is sometimes thought to depict a wholly masculine point of view, Phillip John Usher has demonstrated how the film, by the way it connects images and disparate events, seems to blur gender lines.

Godard followed with Made in U.S.A (1966), the source material for which was Richard Stark's The Jugger. A classic New Wave crime thriller, it was inspired by American Noir films. Anna Karina stars as the anti-hero searching for her murdered lover and the film includes a cameo by Marianne Faithfull. A year later came Two or Three Things I Know About Her (1967), in which Marina Vlady portrays a woman leading a double life as housewife and prostitute, considered to be "among the greatest achievements in filmmaking."

La Chinoise (1967) saw Godard at his most politically forthright so far. The film focused on a group of students and engaged with the ideas coming out of the student activist groups in contemporary France. Released just before the May 1968 events, the film is thought by some to have foreshadowed the student rebellions that took place.

Week End
That same year, Godard made a more colourful and political film, Week End. It follows a Parisian couple as they leave on a weekend trip across the French countryside to collect an inheritance. What ensues is a confrontation with the tragic flaws of the over-consuming bourgeoisie. The film contains an eight-minute tracking shot of the couple stuck in an unremitting traffic jam as they leave the city, cited as a technique Godard used to deconstruct bourgeois trends. Startlingly, a few shots contain extra footage from, as it were, before the beginning of the take (while the actors are preparing) and after the end of the take (while the actors are coming out of character). Week End's enigmatic and audacious end title sequence, which reads "End of Cinema", appropriately marked an end to the narrative and cinematic period in Godard's filmmaking career.

Politics 
Godard was known for his "highly political voice", and regularly featured political content in his films. One of his earliest features, Le petit soldat, which dealt with the Algerian War of Independence, was notable for its attempt to present the complexity of the dispute; the film was perceived as equivocating and as drawing a "moral equivalence" between the French forces and the National Liberation Front. Along these lines, Les Carabiniers presents a fictional war that is initially romanticised in the way its characters approach their service, but becomes a stiff anti-war metonym. In addition to the international conflicts to which Godard sought an artistic response, he was also very concerned with the social problems in France. The earliest and best example of this is Karina's potent portrayal of a prostitute in Vivre sa vie.
In 1960s Paris, the political milieu was not overwhelmed by one specific movement. There was, however, a distinct post-war climate shaped by various international conflicts such as colonialism in North Africa and Southeast Asia. Godard's Marxist disposition did not become abundantly explicit until La Chinoise and Week End, but is evident in several films—namely Pierrot and Une femme mariée.

Godard was accused by some of harbouring anti-Semitic views: in 2010, in the lead-up to the presentation of Godard's honorary Oscar, a prominent article in The New York Times by Michael Cieply drew attention to the idea, which had been circulating through the press in previous weeks, that Godard might be an anti-Semite, and thus undeserving of the accolade. Cieply makes reference to Richard Brody's book Everything is Cinema: The Working Life of Jean-Luc Godard, and alluded to a previous, longer article published by the Jewish Journal as lying near the origin of the debate. The article also draws upon Brody's book, for example in the following quotation, which Godard made on television in 1981: "Moses is my principal enemy...Moses, when he received the commandments, he saw images and translated them. Then he brought the texts, he didn't show what he had seen. That's why the Jewish people are accursed."

Immediately after Cieply's article was published, Brody made a clear point of criticising the "extremely selective and narrow use" of passages in his book, and noted that Godard's work approached the Holocaust with "the greatest moral seriousness". Indeed, his documentaries feature images from the Holocaust in a context suggesting he considers Nazism and the Holocaust as the nadir of human history. Godard's views become more complex regarding the State of Israel. In 1970, Godard travelled to the Middle East to make a pro-Palestinian film he didn't complete and whose footage eventually became part of the 1976 film Ici et ailleurs. In this film, Godard seems to view the Palestinians' cause as one of many worldwide Leftist revolutionary movements. Elsewhere, Godard explicitly identified himself as an anti-Zionist but denied the accusations of anti-Semitism.

Vietnam War 
Godard produced several pieces that directly address the Vietnam War. Furthermore, there are two scenes in Pierrot le fou that tackle the issue. The first is a scene that takes place in the initial car ride between Ferdinand (Belmondo) and Marianne (Karina). Over the car radio, the two hear the message "garrison massacred by the Viet Cong who lost 115 men". Marianne responds with an extended musing on the way the radio dehumanises the Northern Vietnamese combatants. The war is present throughout the film in mentions, allusions, and depictions in newsreel footage, and the film's style was affected by Godard's political anger at the war, upsetting his ability to draw from earlier cinematic styles.

Notably, he also participated in Loin du Vietnam (1967). An anti-war project, it consists of seven sketches directed by Godard (who used stock footage from La Chinoise), Claude Lelouch, Joris Ivens, William Klein, Chris Marker, Alain Resnais, and Agnès Varda.

Bertolt Brecht 
Godard's engagement with German poet and playwright Bertolt Brecht stems primarily from his attempt to transpose Brecht's theory of epic theatre and its prospect of alienating the viewer (Verfremdungseffekt) through a radical separation of the elements of the medium (theatre in Brecht's case, but in Godard's, film). Brecht's influence is keenly felt through much of Godard's work, particularly before 1980, when Godard used cinematic expression for specific political ends.

For example, Breathless's elliptical editing, which denies the viewer a fluid narrative typical of mainstream cinema, forces the viewers to take on more critical roles, connecting the pieces themselves and coming away with more investment in the work's content. In many of his most political pieces, specifically Week-end, Pierrot le Fou, and La Chinoise, characters address the audience with thoughts, feelings, and instructions.

Marxism 

A Marxist reading is possible with most if not all of Godard's early work. Godard's direct interaction with Marxism does not become explicitly apparent, however, until Week End, where the name Karl Marx is cited in conjunction with figures such as Jesus Christ. A constant refrain throughout Godard's cinematic period is that of the bourgeoisie's consumerism, the commodification of daily life and activity, and man's alienation—all central features of Marx's critique of capitalism.

In an essay on Godard, philosopher and aesthetics scholar Jacques Rancière states, "When in Pierrot le fou, 1965, a film without a clear political message, Belmondo played on the word 'scandal' and the 'freedom' that the Scandal girdle supposedly offered women, the context of a Marxist critique of commodification, of pop art derision at consumerism, and of a feminist denunciation of women's false 'liberation', was enough to foster a dialectical reading of the joke and the whole story." The way Godard treated politics in his cinematic period was in the context of a joke, a piece of art, or a relationship, presented to be used as tools of reference, romanticising the Marxist rhetoric, rather than being solely tools of education.

Une femme mariée is also structured around Marx's concept of commodity fetishism. Godard once said that it is "a film in which individuals are considered as things, in which chases in a taxi alternate with ethological interviews, in which the spectacle of life is intermingled with its analysis". He was very conscious of the way he wished to portray the human being. His efforts are overtly characteristic of Marx, who in his Economic and Philosophical Manuscripts of 1844 gives one of his most nuanced elaborations, analysing how the worker is alienated from his product, the object of his productive activity. Georges Sadoul, in his short rumination on the film, describes it as a "sociological study of the alienation of the modern woman".

Revolutionary period (1968–1979) 
The period which spans from May 1968 into the 1970s has been given various labelsfrom his "militant" period, to his "radical" period, along with terms as specific as "Maoist" and as vague as "political". In any case, the period saw Godard employ consistent revolutionary rhetoric in his films and in his public statements.

Inspired by the May 68 upheaval, Godard, alongside François Truffaut, led protests that shut down the 1968 Cannes Film Festival in solidarity with the students and workers. Godard stated there was not a single film showing at the festival that represented their causes. "Not one, whether by Milos [Forman], myself, [Roman] Polanski or François. There are none. We're behind the times."

Films 
Amid the upheavals of the late 1960s, Godard became passionate about "making political films politically." Though many of his films from 1968 to 1972 are feature-length films, they are low-budget and challenge the notion of what a film can be. In addition to abandoning mainstream filmmaking, Godard also tried to escape the cult of personality that had formed around him. He worked anonymously in collaboration with other filmmakers, most notably Jean-Pierre Gorin, with whom he formed the Dziga-Vertov cinema collective. During this period Godard made films in England, Italy, Czechoslovakia, Palestine, and the U.S., as well as France. He and Gorin toured with their work, attempting to create discussion, mainly on college campuses. This period came to a climax with the big-budget production Tout Va Bien, which starred Yves Montand and Jane Fonda. Owing to a motorcycle accident that severely incapacitated Godard, Gorin ended up directing this most celebrated of their work together almost single-handedly. As a companion piece to Tout va bien, the pair made Letter to Jane, a 50-minute "examination of a still" showing Jane Fonda visiting with the Viet Cong during the Vietnam War. The film is a deconstruction of Western imperialist ideology. This was the last film that Godard and Gorin made together.

In 1978 Godard was commissioned by the Mozambican government to make a short film. During this time his experience with Kodak film led him to criticise the film stock as "inherently racist" since it did not reflect the variety, nuance or complexity in dark brown or dark skin. This was because Kodak Shirley cards were only made for Caucasian subjects, a problem that was not rectified until 1995.

Sonimage 
In 1972, Godard and his life partner, Swiss filmmaker, Anne-Marie Miéville started the alternative video production and distribution company Sonimage, based in Grenoble. Under Sonimage, Godard produced Comment ca va, Numéro Deux (1975) and Sauve qui peut (la vie) (1980). In 1976, Godard and Miéville, his wife, collaborated on a series of innovative video works for European broadcast television, titled Six fois deux/Sur et sous la communication (1976) and France/tour/détour/deux/enfants (1978). From the time that Godard returned to mainstream filmmaking in 1980, Anne-Marie Miéville remained an important collaborator.

Jean-Pierre Gorin 
After the events of May 1968, when the city of Paris saw a total upheaval in response to the "authoritarian de Gaulle", and Godard's professional objective was reconsidered, he began to collaborate with like-minded individuals in the filmmaking arena. His most notable collaborator was Jean-Pierre Gorin, a Maoist student of Louis Althusser, Michel Foucault, and Jacques Lacan, who later became a professor of Film Studies at the University of California at San Diego, with a passion for cinema that attracted Godard's attention.

Between 1968 and 1973, Godard and Gorin collaborated to make a total of five films with strong Maoist messages. The most prominent film from the collaboration was Tout Va Bien (1972). The film starred Jane Fonda, who was, at the time, the wife of French filmmaker Roger Vadim. Fonda was at the height of her acting career, having won an Academy Award for her performance in Klute (1971), and has gained notoriety as a left-wing anti-war activist. The male lead was the legendary French singer and actor Yves Montand, who had appeared in prestigious films by Georges Clouzot, Alain Résnais, Sacha Guitry, Vincente Minelli, George Cukor, and Costa-Gavras.

Dziga Vertov Group 

The small group of Maoists that Godard had brought together, which included Gorin, adopted the name Dziga Vertov Group. Godard had a specific interest in Dziga Vertov, a Soviet filmmakerwho was known for a series of radical documentaries titled "Kino Pravda" (literally, "film truth") and the late silent-era feature film Man with a Movie Camera (1929). Vertov was also a contemporary of both Soviet montage theorists, notably Sergei Eisenstein, and Russian constructivist and avant-garde artists such as Alexander Rodchenko and Vladimir Tatlin. Part of Godard's political shift after May 1968 was toward a proactive participation in the class struggle and he drew inspiration from filmmakers associated with the Russian Revolution.

Towards the end of this period of his life, Godard began to feel disappointed with his Maoist ideals and was abandoned by his wife at the time, Anne Wiazemsky. In this context, according to biographer Antoine de Baecque, Godard attempted suicide on two occasions.

Return to commercial films and Histoire(s) du cinéma: 1980–2000 
Godard returned to somewhat more traditional fiction with Sauve qui peut (la vie) (1980), the first of a series of more mainstream films marked by autobiographical currents: it was followed by Passion, Lettre à Freddy Buache (both 1982), Prénom Carmen (1983), and Grandeur et décadence d'un petit commerce de cinéma (1986). There was, though, another flurry of controversy with Je vous salue, Marie (1985), which was condemned by the Roman Catholic Church for alleged heresy, and also with King Lear (1987), an essay film on William Shakespeare and language. Also completed in 1987 was a segment in the film Aria which was based loosely from the plot of Armide; it is set in a gym and uses several arias by Jean-Baptiste Lully from his famous Armide.

His later films were marked by great formal beauty and frequently a sense of requiem: Nouvelle Vague (New Wave, 1990), the autobiographical JLG/JLG, autoportrait de décembre (JLG/JLG: Self-Portrait in December, 1995), and For Ever Mozart (1996). Allemagne année 90 neuf zéro (Germany Year 90 Nine Zero, 1991) which is a quasi-sequel to Alphaville, but done with an elegiac tone and focus on the inevitable decay of age. In 1990, Godard was presented with a special award from the National Society of Film Critics. Between 1988 and 1998, he produced the multi-part series Histoire(s) du cinéma, a monumental project which combined all the innovations of his video work with a passionate engagement in the issues of twentieth-century history and the history of film itself.

Late period films: 2001–2023 
In 2001, Éloge de l'amour (In Praise of Love) was released. The film is notable for its use of both film and video—the first half captured in 35 mm black and white, the latter half shot in color on DV—and subsequently transferred to film for editing. The film is also noted for containing themes of ageing, love, separation, and rediscovery as it follows the young artist Edgar in his contemplation of a new work on the four stages of love. In Notre musique (2004), Godard turned his focus to war, specifically, the war in Sarajevo, but with attention to all war, including the American Civil War, the war between the U.S. and Native Americans, and the Israeli–Palestinian conflict. The film is structured into three Dantean kingdoms: Hell, Purgatory, and Paradise. Godard's fascination with paradox is constant in the film. It opens with a long, ponderous montage of war images that occasionally lapses into the comic; Paradise is shown as a lush wooded beach patrolled by U.S. Marines.

Godard's film Film Socialisme (2010) premiered in the Un Certain Regard section at the 2010 Cannes Film Festival. It was released theatrically in France in May 2010. Godard was rumoured to be considering directing a film adaptation of Daniel Mendelsohn's The Lost: A Search for Six of Six Million, an award-winning book about the Holocaust. In 2013, Godard released the short Les trois désastres (The Three Disasters) as part of the omnibus film 3X3D with filmmakers Peter Greenaway and Edgar Pera. 3X3D premiered at the 2013 Cannes Film Festival. His 2014 film Goodbye to Language, shot in 3-D, revolves around a couple who cannot communicate with each other until their pet dog acts as an interpreter for them. The film makes reference to a wide range of influences such as paintings by Nicolas de Staël and the writing of William Faulkner, as well as the work of mathematician Laurent Schwartz and dramatist Bertolt Brecht—one of Godard's most important influences. It was selected to compete for the Palme d'Or in the main competition section at the 2014 Cannes Film Festival, where it won the Jury Prize. Godard's non-traditional script for the film was described as a collage of handwritten text and images, and a "artwork" itself.

In 2015 J. Hoberman reported that Godard was working on a new film. Initially titled Tentative de bleu, in December 2016 Wild Bunch co-chief Vincent Maraval stated that Godard had been shooting Le livre d'image (The Image Book) for almost two years "in various Arab countries, including Tunisia" and that it is an examination of the modern Arab World. Le livre d'image was first shown in November 2018. On 4 December 2019, an art installation piece created by Godard opened at the Fondazione Prada in Milan. Titled Le Studio d'Orphée, the installation is a recreated workspace and includes editing equipment, furniture, and other materials used by Godard in post-production.

In 2020 Godard told Les Inrockuptibles that his new film would be about a Yellow vest protestor, and indicated that along with archival footage "there will also be a shoot. I don't know if I will find what are called actors...I would like to film the people we see on news channels but by plunging them into a situation where documentary and fiction come together." In March 2021 he said that he was working on two new films during a virtual interview at the International Film Festival of Kerala. Godard stated "I'm finishing my movie life  yes, my moviemaker life  by doing two scripts...After, I will say, 'Goodbye, cinema.

In July 2021, cinematographer and long time collaborator Fabrice Aragno said that work on the films was going slowly and Godard was more focused on "books, on the ideas of the film, and less in the making." Godard suggested making a film like Chris Marker's La Jetée in order to "come back to his origin." Much of the film would be shot on 35mm, 16mm and 8mm film, but the expense of celluloid film stock and the COVID-19 pandemic stalled production. Aragno expected to shoot test footage that fall. He added that the second film was for the Arte channel in France.

Aragno said that he didn't think that either film would be Godard's last film, adding "I say this often that Éloge de l'amour was the beginning of his last gesture. These five, or six or seven films are connected to each other in a way, they're not just full stops. It's not just one painting." The first of the two films, a 20-minute short titled Funny Wars, will premiere at the 2023 Cannes Film Festival. The second, Scenario, was left unfinished at the time of Godard's death, and will be finished by Aragno and Jean-Paul Battagia.

Legacy 
Godard has been recognised as one of the most influential filmmakers of the 20th century and one of the leaders of the French New Wave.

In 1969, film critic Roger Ebert wrote about Godard's importance in cinema:

In 2001, Ebert recalled his early days as a critic, writing "As much as we talked about Tarantino after Pulp Fiction, we talked about Godard in those days." Tarantino cites Godard as an influence; he named a production company he founded A Band Apart, a reference to Godard's 1964 film.

Godard's works and innovations were praised by notable directors such as Michelangelo Antonioni, Satyajit Ray, and Orson Welles. Welles admired Godard as a director but criticized him as a thinker, telling Peter Bogdanovich, "He is the definitive influence if not really the first great film artist of this last decade, and his gifts as a director are enormous. I just can't take him very seriously as a thinker—and that's where we seem to differ, because he does." David Thomson reached a similar conclusion, writing that "Godard's greatness rests in his grasping of the idea that films are made of moving images, of moments from films, of images projected in front of audiences" but that "He knows only cinema: on politics and real life he is childish and pretentious." Still, Thomson calls Godard's early films "a magnificent critical explanation of American movies" and ''one of the inescapable bodies of work" and deserving of retrospectives. Thomson included Pierrot Le Fou on his Sight & Sound list. Fritz Lang agreed to take part in Godard's film Le Mépris due to his admiration of Godard as a director. Akira Kurosawa listed Breathless as one of his 100 favourite films. Political activist, critic, and filmmaker Tariq Ali listed Godard's film Tout Va Bien as one of his ten favourite films of all time in the 2012 Sight and Sound critics' poll. American film critic Armond White listed Godard's film Nouvelle Vague as one of his top ten favourite films in the same poll. Susan Sontag called Vivre sa vie "one of the most extraordinary, beautiful and original works of art I know of."

Godard's films have influenced and inspired many directors, including Martin Scorsese,  Francis Ford Coppola, George Lucas, David Lynch, David Cronenberg, Peter Bogdanovich, Brian De Palma, Oliver Stone, William Friedkin, Steven Soderbergh, Andrei Tarkovsky, Andrei Konchalovsky, Alejandro Jodorowsky, Abbas Kiarostami, Atom Egoyan, D. A. Pennebaker, Claire Denis, Robert Altman, Jim Jarmusch, Takeshi Kitano, Gaspar Noé, John Waters, Mamoru Oshii, Shane Carruth, Stan Brakhage, Ken Loach, Kevin Macdonald, Abel Ferrara, Luca Guadagnino, Terence Davies, Paul Schrader, Rainer Werner Fassbinder, Wong Kar-wai, Edward Yang, Hou Hsiao-hsien, Wim Wenders, Chantal Akerman, Bela Tarr, Theo Angelopoulos, Raoul Peck, Glauber Rocha, Fernando Solanas, Octavio Getino, Emir Kusturica, Terrence Malick, Paul Thomas Anderson, Wes Anderson, Richard Linklater, Harmony Korine, Darren Aronofsky, Bernardo Bertolucci, Dušan Makavejev, Marco Bellocchio, and Pier Paolo Pasolini.

Four of Godard's films are included on the 2022 edition of the British Film Institute (BFI) Sight and Sound magazine list of 100 Greatest Films: Breathless (13), Le Mépris (21), Pierrot le Fou (42), and Histoire(s) du cinéma (48).

The 60th New York Film Festival which was held in 2022 paid tribute to Godard who died earlier that year. The Onion paid homage to Godard with the headline "Jean-Luc Godard Dies At End of Life In Uncharacteristically Linear Narrative Choice."

Personal life and death 
Godard was married to two of his leading women: Anna Karina (1961–1965) and Anne Wiazemsky (1967–1979). Beginning in 1970, he collaborated personally and professionally with Anne-Marie Miéville. Godard lived with Miéville in Rolle, Switzerland, from 1978 onwards, and was described by his former wife Karina as a "recluse". Godard married Miéville in the 2010s, according to Patrick Jeanneret, an adviser to Godard.

His relationship with Karina in particular produced some of his most critically acclaimed films, and their relationship was widely publicised: The Independent described them as "one of the most celebrated pairings of the 1960s". Filmmaker magazine called their collaborations "arguably the most influential body of work in the history of cinema." Late in life, however, Karina said they no longer spoke to each other.

Through his father, he was the cousin of Pedro Pablo Kuczynski, former President of Peru.

In 2017, Michel Hazanavicius directed a film about Godard, Redoubtable, based on the memoir One Year After (2015) by Wiazemsky. It centers on his life in the late 1960s, when he and Wiazemsky made films together. The film premiered at the Cannes Film Festival in 2017. Godard said that the film was a "stupid, stupid idea".

Agnes Varda's 2017 documentary Faces Places culminates with Varda and co-director JR knocking on Godard's front door in Rolle for an interview. Godard agreed to the meeting but he "stands them up". His nephew and assistant Paul Grivas directed the 2018 documentary Film Catastrophe, which included behind-the-scenes footage, shot on the Costa Concordia cruise ship by Grivas during the making of Film Socialism, of Godard working with actors and directing the film. Godard participated in the 2022 documentary . Director Mitra Farahani initiated an email exchange between Godard and Iranian filmmaker Ebrahim Golestan, with emailed text letters from Golestan and "videos, images, and aphorism" responses from Godard.

At the age of 91, Godard died on 13 September 2022, at his home in Rolle. His death was reported as an assisted suicide procedure, which is legal in Switzerland. Godard's legal advisor said that he had "multiple disabling pathologies", but a family member said that "He was not sick, he was simply exhausted". Miéville was at his side when he died. His body was cremated and there was no funeral service.

Selected filmography 

Feature films
The list excludes multi-director anthology films to which Godard has contributed shorts.

 1960 Breathless
 1961 A Woman Is a Woman
 1962 My Life to Live
 1963 The Little Soldier
 1963 The Carabineers
 1963 Contempt
 1964 Band of Outsiders
 1964 A Married Woman
 1965 Alphaville
 1965 Pierrot le Fou
 1966 Masculin Féminin
 1966 Made in U.S.A.
 1967 Two or Three Things I Know About Her
 1967 La Chinoise
 1967 Week-end
 1968 A Film Like Any Other
 1968 One Plus One (Sympathy for the Devil)
 1969 Joy of Learning
 1969 British Sounds
 1970 Wind from the East
 1971 Struggle in Italy
 1971 Vladimir et Rosa
 1972 Tout va bien
 1972 Letter to Jane
 1975 Number Two
 1976 Here and Elsewhere
 1976/1978 How's It Going?
 1980 Every Man for Himself
 1982 Passion
 1983 First Name: Carmen
 1985 Hail Mary
 1985 Detective
 1987 King Lear
 1987 Keep Your Right Up
 1990 New Wave
 1991 Germany Year 90 Nine Zero
 1993 The Kids Play Russian
 1993 Oh Woe Is Me
 1994 JLG/JLG – Self-Portrait in December
 1996 For Ever Mozart
 2001 In Praise of Love
 2004 Notre musique
 2010 Film Socialisme
 2014 Goodbye to Language
 2018 The Image Book

Collaboration with ECM Records 
Godard had a lasting friendship with Manfred Eicher, founder and head of the German music label ECM Records. The label released the soundtracks of Godard's Nouvelle Vague (ECM NewSeries 1600–01) and Histoire(s) du cinéma (ECM NewSeries 1706). This collaboration expanded over the years, leading to Godard's granting ECM permission to use stills from his films for album covers, while Eicher took over the musical direction of Godard films such as Allemagne 90 neuf zéro, Hélas Pour Moi, JLG, and For Ever Mozart. Tracks from ECM records have been used in his films; for example, the soundtrack for In Praise of Love uses Ketil Bjørnstad and David Darling's album Epigraphs extensively. Godard also released on the label a collection of shorts he made with Anne-Marie Miéville called Four Short Films (ECM 5001).

Among the ECM album covers with Godard's film stills are these:
 Voci, works of Luciano Berio played by Kim Kashkashian (ECM 1735)
 Words of The Angel, by Trio Mediaeval (ECM 1753)
 Morimur, by Christoph Poppen & The Hilliard Ensemble (ECM 1765)
 Songs of Debussy and Mozart, by Juliane Banse & András Schiff (ECM 1772)
 Requiem for Larissa, by Valentin Silvestrov (ECM 1778)
 Soul of Things, by Tomasz Stanko Quartet (ECM 1788)
 Suspended Night, by Tomasz Stanko Quartet (ECM 1868)
 Asturiana: Songs from Spain and Argentina, by Kim Kashkashian & Robert Levin (ECM 1975)
 Distances, by Norma Winstone, Glauco Venier & Klaus Gesing (ECM 2028)
 Live at Birdland, by Lee Konitz, Brad Mehldau, Charlie Haden & Paul Motian (ECM 2162)

See also
 List of directors associated with art film

References

Sources and further reading 

 Almeida, Jane. Dziga Vertov Group . São Paulo: witz, 2005. .
 Nicole Brenez, David Faroult, Michael Temple, James E. Williams, Michael Witt (eds.) (2007). Jean-Luc Godard: Documents. Paris: Centre Georges Pompidou.
 
 Dixon, Wheeler Winston. The Films of Jean-Luc Godard. Albany: State University of New York Press, 1997.
 
 Godard, Jean-Luc (2002). The Future(s) of Film: Three Interviews 2000–01. Bern; Berlin: Verlag Gachnang & Springer. .
 Godard, Jean-Luc (2014). Introduction to a True History of Cinema and Television. Montreal: caboose. .
 
 Intxauspe, J.M. (2013). "Film Socialisme: Quo vadis Europa". hAUSnART, 3: 94–99.
 Lake, Steve and Griffiths, Paul, eds. (2007). Horizons Touched: the Music of ECM. Granta Books. . 2007.
 Loshitzky, Yosefa. The Radical Faces of Godard and Bertolucci.
 
 
 Müller, Lars (2010). Windfall Light: The Visual Language of ECM. Lars Müller Publishers.   &  .
 Rainer Kern, Hans-Jürgen Linke and Wolfgang Sandner (2010). Der Blaue Klang. Wolke Verlag.  .
 Silverman, Kaja and Farocki, Harun. 1998. Speaking About Godard. New York: New York University Press.
 Steritt, David (1998). Jean-Luc Godard: Interviews. Jackson, Mississippi: University Press of Mississippi. .
 
 Stevenson, Diane. "Godard and Bazin" in the Andre Bazin special issue, Jeffrey Crouse (ed.), Film International, Issue 30, Vol. 5, No. 6, 2007, pp. 32–40.
 Temple, Michael. Williams, James S. Witt, Michael (eds.) 2007. For Ever Godard. London: Black Dog Publishing.
 Temple, Michael and Williams, James S. (eds.) (2000). The Cinema alone: Essays on the Work of Jean-Luc Godard 1985–2000. Amsterdam: Amsterdam University Press.
 Usher, Phillip John (2009). "De Sexe Incertain: Masculin, Féminin de Godard". French Forum, vol. 34, no. 2, pp. 97–112.

External links

 
 
 Cinema=Godard=Cinema, a hub for academic information and discussion about Godard
 Jean-Luc Godard at the Criterion Collection
 Jean Luc Godard Biography at newwavefilm.com
 Jean-luc Godard Timeline
 Detailed filmography of Jean-Luc Godard on unifrance.org
 Jean-Luc Godard at The Guardian Film
 Jean-Luc Godard at The New York Times Movies
 
 
 Guardian interview (29 April 2005)
 Video dialog—in French—between Godard and the French writer Stéphane Zagdanski about Literature and Cinema, November 2004
 Interview with Jean-Luc Godard, 1972
 Film catastrophe, the shooting of Film socialisme aboard the Costa Concordia

1930 births
2022 deaths
2022 suicides
20th-century French male actors
20th-century French male writers
20th-century screenwriters
20th-century Swiss male actors
20th-century Swiss writers
21st-century French male actors
21st-century French male writers
21st-century screenwriters
21st-century Swiss male actors
21st-century Swiss writers
Academy Honorary Award recipients
Anti–Vietnam War activists
César Honorary Award recipients
Collage filmmakers
Critical theorists
Deaths by euthanasia
Directors of Golden Bear winners
Directors of Golden Lion winners
European Film Awards winners (people)
Existentialists
Film directors from Paris
Film production company founders
Film theorists
French cinematographers
French communists
French experimental filmmakers
French film critics
French film directors
French film editors
French film producers
French humanists
French-language film directors
French male screenwriters
French Marxist writers
French people of Swiss descent
French screenwriters
Georges Delerue Award winners
Irony theorists
Literacy and society theorists
Male actors from Paris
Mass media theorists
Media critics
Metaphor theorists
Silver Bear for Best Director recipients
Suicides in Switzerland
Surrealist filmmakers
Swiss cinematographers
Swiss communists
Swiss film critics
Swiss film directors
Swiss film editors
Swiss filmmakers
Swiss male film actors
Swiss Marxist writers
Swiss screenwriters
Swiss writers in French
Theorists on Western civilization
University of Paris alumni
Writers about activism and social change
Writers from Paris